Paphiopedilum appletonianum is a species of orchid occurring from Hainan Island to Indochina.

Synonyms
Cypripedium appletonianum Gower is the basionym. Other synonyms include:
Cypripedium wolterianum Kraenzl.
Paphiopedilum wolterianum (Kraenzl.) Pfitzer
Cordula appletoniana (Gower) Rolfe
Paphiopedilum hookerae ssp. appletonianum (Gower) M.W.Wood
Paphiopedilum hainanense Fowlie
Paphiopedilum appletonianum var. immaculatum Braem
Paphiopedilum robinsonii f. viride Braem
Paphiopedilum appletonianum f. immaculatum (Braem) Braem
Paphiopedilum appletonianum var. hainanense (Fowlie) Braem
Paphiopedilum cerveranum Braem
Paphiopedilum cerveranum f. viride (Braem) Braem
Paphiopedilum appletonianum f. album Asher ex O.Gruss
Paphiopedilum tridentatum S.C.Chen & Z.J.Liu
Paphiopedilum angustifolium R.F.Guo & Z.J.Liu
Paphiopedilum puberulum S.P.Lei & J.Yong Zhang

appletonianum